Michael Hartley Freedman (born April 21, 1951) is an American mathematician, at Microsoft Station Q, a research group at the University of California, Santa Barbara. In 1986, he was awarded a Fields Medal for his work on the 4-dimensional generalized Poincaré conjecture. Freedman and Robion Kirby showed that an exotic ℝ4 manifold exists.

Life and career
Freedman was born in Los Angeles, California, in the United States. His father, Benedict Freedman, was an American Jewish aeronautical engineer, musician, writer, and mathematician. His mother, Nancy Mars Freedman, performed as an actress and also trained as an artist. His parents cowrote a series of novels together.  He entered the University of California, Berkeley, but dropped out after two semesters. In the same year he wrote a letter to Ralph Fox, a Princeton professor at the time, and was admitted to graduate school so in 1968 he continued his studies at Princeton University where he received Ph.D. degree in 1973 for his doctoral dissertation titled Codimension-Two Surgery, written under the supervision of William Browder. After graduating, Freedman returned to Berkeley, where he was a lecturer in the department of mathematics until 1975.  He left Berkeley to become a member of the Institute for Advanced Study (IAS) in Princeton. In 1976 he was appointed assistant professor in the department of mathematics at the University of California, San Diego. He spent the year 1980/81 at IAS, returning to UCSD, where in 1982 he was promoted to professor. He was appointed the Charles Lee Powell chair of mathematics at UCSD in 1985.

Freedman has received numerous awards and honors including Sloan and Guggenheim Fellowships, a MacArthur Fellowship, and the National Medal of Science. He is an elected member of the National Academy of Sciences, and a fellow of the American Academy of Arts and Sciences and of the American Mathematical Society. In addition to winning a Fields Medal at the International Congress of Mathematicians (ICM) in 1986 in Berkeley, he was an Invited Speaker at the ICM in 1983 in Warsaw and at the ICM in 1998 in Berlin. He currently works at Microsoft Station Q at the University of California, Santa Barbara, where his team is involved in the development of the topological quantum computer.

Publications

 Michael H. Freedman and Frank Quinn, Topology of 4-manifolds,  Princeton Mathematical Series, vol 39, Princeton University Press, Princeton, New Jersey, 1990. 
 
 Freedman, Michael H.: Z2-systolic-freedom. Proceedings of the Kirbyfest (Berkeley, California, 1998), 113–123, Geom. Topol. Monogr., 2, Geom. Topol. Publ., Coventry, 1999.
 Freedman, Michael H.; Meyer, David A.; Luo, Feng: Z2-systolic freedom and quantum codes. Mathematics of quantum computation, 287–320, Comput. Math. Ser., Chapman & Hall/CRC, Boca Raton, Florida, 2002.

See also
4-manifold
5-manifold
Casson handle
Exotic R4
Fake 4-ball
Intersection form of a 4-manifold
Möbius energy

References

External links
Michael H. Freedman, Microsoft Technical Fellow and Director of Station Q

Members of the United States National Academy of Sciences
20th-century American mathematicians
21st-century American mathematicians
American people of Romanian-Jewish descent
Fields Medalists
National Medal of Science laureates
MacArthur Fellows
Microsoft technical fellows
University of California, Santa Barbara faculty
Princeton University alumni
Institute for Advanced Study visiting scholars
1951 births
Living people
People from Los Angeles
Fellows of the American Mathematical Society
Fellows of the American Academy of Arts and Sciences
Sloan Research Fellows
Mathematicians from California
University of California, Berkeley College of Letters and Science faculty